Münzenberg is a town in the Wetteraukreis district in Hesse, Germany. It is located 13 km north of Friedberg, and 16 km southeast of Gießen. Münzenberg Castle is located outside the town.

Population development

Born in Münzenberg

 Theodor Morell (1886-1948), born in the district of Trais, physician, from 1936 to 1945 private physician of Adolf Hitler

References

Wetteraukreis